Emporia State University is a public university in Emporia, Kansas, United States, east of the Flint Hills. Established in March 1863 and originally known as the Kansas State Normal School, Emporia State is the third oldest public university in the state of Kansas. Emporia State is one of six public universities governed by the Kansas Board of Regents.

Notable alumni

Politics and government
 Jim Barnett – physician and former Kansas senator; Republican nominee for governor in 2006
 Roscoe Cartwright, first black field artilleryman promoted to brigadier general.
 Stephanie Clayton – member of the Kansas House of Representatives
 William J. Durham – African-American attorney and leader in the civil rights movement
 Stan Frownfelter – member of the Kansas House of Representatives
 Thompson Benton Ferguson – politician, teacher, newspaper editor and appointed as Governor of Oklahoma Territory (1901-1906); thereafter resided in Watonga, Oklahoma
 L. M. Gensman – former U.S. Representative from Oklahoma
Lea Giménez, Minister of Finance (Paraguay)
 Jim Kelly – member of the Kansas House of Representatives
 Jeff Longbine – member of the Kansas Senate
 John Conover Nichols – former U.S. Rep. from Oklahoma; vice president of Transcontinental and Western Airlines
 Roy Wilford Riegle – probate judge, teacher, Kansas Senate member, Knights Templar Grand Master
 Dale Emerson Saffels – member of the Kansas House of Representatives; nominated by President Jimmy Carter in 1979 to the United States District Court for the District of Kansas
Mark Schreiber – member of the Kansas House of Representatives
 Harold See – associate justice of the Alabama Supreme Court
 Jack Sinagra– mayor, state senator, chair of Port Authority of New York and New Jersey

 Sam V. Stewart – Montana Supreme Court Justice
 Vern Swanson – Kansas House of Representatives House District 64
 Annie Tietze – Kansas House of Representatives House District 53
 Grant F. Timmerman – awarded Medal of Honor posthumously for heroism during Battle of Saipan
 Mark Treaster – former member of Kansas House of Representatives
 Ed Trimmer – Kansas House of Representatives House District 79
 Bob Whittaker – United States House of Representatives

Media and arts
 Kay Alden – five-time Emmy award-winning television writer
 Louis F. Burns – Osage Nation/Osage Indian historian and author
 James Pringle Cook – Western landscape painter
 Curt Dawson (1960)  – stage and television actor
 Barry Johnson - artist
 Katie A. Keane – theatrical/television actress
 Evan Lindquist – artist given Lifetime Achievement Award by the Society of American Graphic Artists (SAGA) in 2010
 Hattie Horner Louthan – author of five books and contributor to newspapers and magazines
 Deborah Raney – women's fiction writer
 Randall J. Stephens – author and historian

Science and technology
 Panos Zavos – reproduction specialist

Business
 William Coffin Coleman – founder of Coleman Company; taught at Ottawa University for a year before serving as principal of Blue Rapids schools for a year; mayor of Wichita in 1923 and 1924
 Ken Hush – held multiple executive positions at Koch Minerals and Carbon, Emporia State’s 18th president

Education
 H. Edward Flentje – professor at Wichita State University; interim president of ESU in 2011
 Harry Levinson – Chairman emeritus and founder of the Levinson Institute; clinical professor of psychology (emeritus) at Harvard Medical School
 Barbara Kiefer Lewalski – Guggenheim Fellow in 1967; William R. Kenan, Jr. Professor of History and Literature and of English, Emeritus at Harvard
 W. Ann Reynolds – chancellor of the California State University and City University of New York
 Jackie Vietti – President of Butler Community College for 17 years; Interim President of ESU in 2015

Athletes and coaches
 Frank Anderson – former head baseball coach for the Oklahoma State Cowboys, now an assistant for the University of Tennessee
 Dale Burnett – former NFL player; played for the New York Giants and was on 1932 World Championship team
 Glenn Campbell – NFL player for New York Giants, Philadelphia Eagles and Pittsburgh Pirates
 Jory Collins – 6th head women's basketball coach at Emporia State from 2010 to 2018
 Eldon Danenhauer – NFL player for Denver Broncos
 John Davis – NFL player for Tampa Bay Buccaneers, Minnesota Vikings and Chicago Bears
 Don Dennis – pitched for St. Louis Cardinals in 1965 and 1966
 Al Feuerbach – former Olympian and world record holder in the shot put
 Bob Fornelli – head baseball coach at Emporia State (2004–2018)
 Kelly Goodburn – NFL player for Kansas City Chiefs and Washington Redskins; played in XXIV Super Bowl when Washington won World Championship

 Homer Woodson Hargiss – head football coach for 12 years and compiled a 62-23-11 record; his 1926 squad produced a 7-0-0 record, the only perfect season in ESU history
 Steve Henry – drafted by the NFL St. Louis Cardinals in 1979; played one year each for the Cardinals, the New York Giants, and the Baltimore Colts
 Garin Higgins – current head football coach at Emporia State
 Brad Hill – head baseball coach at Kansas State University (2004–2018)
 Gene Johnson – head basketball coach at Wichita State University and Kansas Wesleyan University, won two AAU national titles and was assistant coach for the 1936 gold medal Olympic basketball team; credited with inventing the full-court zone press
 Fred Kipp – played baseball for the New York Yankees, Brooklyn Dodgers, and Los Angeles Dodgers
 Ryan Kohlmeier – played on various Major League Baseball teams, as well as Minor League Baseball teams; current dentist in Emporia, KS
 John Kuck – gold medal winner in the shot put at the 1928 Summer Olympics in Amsterdam
 Bob Leahy – played in the NFL for the Pittsburgh Steelers and also coached in the NFL
 Leon Lett – helped Hornets to the NAIA National Championship game in 1989; played for Dallas Cowboys in 3 Super Bowls
 John Lohmeyer – defensive end for Emporia State and former Kansas City Chiefs player; currently Director of Development for the Emporia State University foundation
 George Munday – NFL player for Cleveland Indians, New York Giants, Cincinnati Reds and St. Louis Gunners
 Archie San Romani – won the national collegiate mile in 1935 and the 1,500-meter run in 1936; anchored distance medley relay that set world record in 1936; was fourth in the 1,500-meter run at the 1936 Olympics in Berlin; set a world record in the 2,000-meter run in 1937 that stood for 25 years
 Brian Shay – running back for ESU; won the 1998 Harlon Hill Trophy; broke 17 NCAA Division II records; played for the Berlin Thunder and Orlando Rage; was a member of the 1999 Kansas City Chiefs practice squad
 Steve Shifflett – major league baseball player for Kansas City Royals
 Harry Short - Baseball player and manager
 Bill Tidwell – four-time NAIA national cross country champion; Emporia State Athletics Director from 1971 to 1979, cross country and track & field coach from 1979–1984
 Fran Welch – quarterbacked ESU football team to a 24-1-2 record; in 24 years as a football coach, compiled a 116-81-15 mark; his track and cross country teams claimed 18 league crowns, four NAIA cross country championships, one NAIA track title, and one NCAA small college cross country title
 Austin Willis – football player

Presidents

These persons have served as presidents or interim presidents of Kansas State Normal School (1863–1923), Kansas State Teachers College (1923–1974), Emporia Kansas State College (1974–1977), and Emporia State University (1977–present).

See also

 Lists of people from Kansas
 Emporia State University School of Business
 Emporia State University Teachers College
 Emporia State Hornets
 List of Emporia State Hornets head football coaches
Emporia State Hornets basketball

References
Notes

Citations

External links
 Emporia State University Alumni Association

Emporia State University people